The Humanitarian Award is a specially designated Satellite Award for special achievement via community involvement and work on social causes. Unlike the Satellite Award statuettes, which are decided by the voting membership, honorees are selected each year by the IPA President and Board Members.

The award is for those in the entertainment industry who have truly made a difference in the lives of those in the artistic community and beyond.

Honorees

 2010: Connie Stevens
 2011: Tim Hetherington
 2012: Benh Zeitlin
 2013: - none -
 2014: Sebastian Junger
 2015: Spike Lee
 2016: Patrick Stewart
 2017: Stephen Chbosky
 2018: - none -
 2019: Mounia Meddour
 2020: Mark Wahlberg
 2021: Val Kilmer

References

External links
 International Press Academy website

Humanitarian
Awards established in 2010